Manding Claro (born 1938) is a former Filipino matinee idol of LVN Pictures of the 1950s paired with another matinee idol, Nenita Vidal.

Their teaming was very popular during the mid-1950s for movies such as Dalagita't Binatilyo and Banda Uno in 1955, Puppy Love in 1956,  Medalyong Perlas, a musical in 1956, Phone Pal, Lelong Mong Panot and Troop 11 in 1957.

He later transferred to Sampaguita Pictures, where he made several more movies and ended his career as an actor to  pursue a career as a singer. He was very successful as a singer for many years with tours throughout Asia.

He retired from show business in 1958. He was inducted to the Eastwood City Walk Of Fame in December 2013.

Filmography

Awards
Celebrity Inductee, 2013 Eastwood City Walk Of Fame

References 

1938 births
Living people
Filipino male film actors